Takhar is a god in the Serer religion.

Takhar may also refer to:


Places
 Takhar, Punjab, a village in Jalandhar district of Punjab State, India
 Takhar Province, Afghanistan
 Takhar University
 The likely historical basis of the Vedic Tushara Kingdom
 Tukhara, an alternate name for the historical Iranian region of Bactria

People
 Bajrang Lal Takhar (born 1981), an Indian rower
 Harinder Takhar (born 1951), a Canadian politician
 Mandy Takhar, a Punjabi-British actor

See also
 Tocharian languages, extinct Indo-European languages of the Tarim Basin, China
 Tocharians, the Tocharian-speaking peoples of the Tarim